Cyrano Fernández is a 2007 Venezuelan drama film based on the 1897 play Cyrano de Bergerac by Edmond Rostand, but set in contemporary times.

Synopsis
The movie is based on the love triangle between Cyrano (Édgar Ramírez), Cristian (Pastor Oviedo) and Roxanna (Jessika Grau) during riots between a group of drug dealers and the residents of a slum in Caracas.

Cyrano is a romantic writer and the social hero of his barrio, alluding to the leaders of the Tupamaro movement.

Production 
The film is set in the  barrio of Caracas, where it was filmed; filming took place over eight weeks in 2006. The film also premiered in Cota 905.

Ramirez, after having made his Hollywood debut a few years earlier, was cast against type in Cyrano Fernández, with Cyrano different to Ramirez' "mostly one-dimensional 'macho' characters" to that point.

Awards
At the 2008 Venezuelan film festival, the film won seven awards: Best Film, Best Director (Alberto Arvelo), Best Actor (Edgar Ramírez), Best Editing (Paco Belllot), Best Sound (Rosa María Oliart). It was also nominated for Best Cinematography (Cesary Javorsky) and Best Writing (Alberto Arvelo).

Ramirez won two other Best Actor awards for the film, his first major awards. One was from the Amiens International Film Festival, the other from the Málaga Film Festival.

References

External links
 Cyrano Fernandez - Official Website.
 
 

2007 films
2000s Spanish-language films
2007 drama films
Films based on Cyrano de Bergerac (play)
Venezuelan films based on plays
Venezuelan drama films